Turandot (1762) is a commedia dell'arte play by Count Carlo Gozzi after a supposedly Persian story from the collection Les Mille et un jours (1710–1712) by François Pétis de la Croix (not to be confused with One Thousand and One Nights). Gozzi's Turandot was first performed at the Teatro San Samuele, Venice, on 22 January 1762.

Gozzi's play has given rise to a number of subsequent artistic endeavours, including combinations of: versions/translations by Schiller, Karl Vollmoeller and Brecht; theatrical productions by Goethe, Max Reinhardt and Yevgeny Vakhtangov; incidental music by Weber, Busoni and Wilhelm Stenhammar; and operas by Busoni, Puccini and Havergal Brian.

Original play and performance

Turandot was deliberately written in the Commedia dell'arte style by Gozzi, as part of a campaign in his literary war against the bourgeois, realistic works of Pietro Chiari and Carlo Goldoni. Gozzi was intimate with the out-of work theatre troupe of Antonio Sacchi, an inveterate commedia Truffaldino.  It was first performed by Sacchi's troupe at the Teatro San Samuele in Venice on 22 January 1762, and received seven subsequent performances. The choice of theatre itself was a pointed attack on Goldoni, since he had been the theatre's director between 1737–1741. In the end, Gozzi won his literary war: according to his Memoirs, "Chiari stopped writing when he saw that his dramas ceased to take. Goldoni went to Paris, to seek his fortune there, whereof we shall be duly informed in his Memoirs."

Friedrich Werthes
The poet and playwright Friedrich Werthes (Buttenhausen, 12 October 1748–Stuttgart, 5 December 1817) made a translation of Gozzi's complete plays, employing prose rather than verse for the characters' lines.   Schiller's Turandot (see below) is partly based on Werthes' version.

Friedrich Schiller

In 1801 Friedrich Schiller translated Gozzi's Commedia dell'arte play, at the same time re-interpreting it in the Romantic style.

It was first produced in 1802 by at the 'old' Weimar Hoftheater by Johann von Goethe, who had been the theatre's director since its inception in 1791. Schiller had begun a collaborative friendship with Goethe in 1794 which lasted until Schiller's death in 1805, after which Goethe forsook ballads and turned to the completion of Part one of Faust.

Comparison of Gozzi's and Schiller's versions
Gozzi's play has a "light, sarcastic tone" whereas Schiller transforms it into a symbolic epic with an idealised moral attitude. Gozzi, although he also uses both elements of drama and comedy, puts them side by side as independent parts; Schiller combines them and makes them the result of each other. This interaction of dramatic and comical, their interdependence and the fact of their being equally matched, embodies the Romantic principle of universalism.

Gozzi's main character, the princess Turandot, seems to act out of a mood and cruelty whereas Schiller's Turandot is a person who resolutely follows her moral and ethical attitude. Also prince Calàf, who is a kind of lost soul and philanderer in Gozzi's version, becomes a kind lover who surrenders to his deep and true love for Turandot.

The classical commedia dell’arte characters in the play, especially Pantalone and Brighella, whose language is rather colloquial in Gozzi's version, lose their naïve nature and even speak in well-formed verses in Schiller's work; they also contribute to the more severe and moralistic atmosphere in Schiller's adaptation.

Carl Maria von Weber
Carl Maria von Weber based his  1805 Chinese Ouverture on a Chinese theme found in Jean-Jacques Rousseau's Dictionnaire de musique. 
Weber's friend, the composer Franz Danzi, was employed as Kapellmeister in the Stuttgart court of King Frederick I of Württemberg, and when Weber obtained a non-musical position as the private secretary of the King's brother, Duke Ludwig, Danzi encouraged Weber to write some music for a performance of Schiller's play at the court theatre. The result was his 1809 Incidental music for Turandot, J.37 which incorporated the Chinese Ouverture.

Franz Danzi
Franz Danzi later wrote his own singspiel Turandot based on Schiller in 1816, which was performed in Karlsruhe in 1817.

'J. Hoven'
The lawyer and composer Johann Vesque von Püttlingen was a friend of Franz Schubert and Felix Mendelssohn. Born in the Lubomirski Palace, near Lublin, West Galicia, he grew up in Vienna and trained as a lawyer, rising to section director in the Austrian Foreign Ministry under Metternich. Under the pseudonym 'J. Hoven' (after Ludwig van Beethoven) he composed over 300 songs and 8 operas, among which was Turandot, Princess of Shiraz, libretto after Schiller, first performed on 3 October 1838.

Andrea Maffei
Schiller's play was re-translated into Italian by his friend Andrea Maffei in 1863.

Antonio Bazzini
Antonio Bazzini's opera Turanda, with a libretto by Antonio Gazzoletti, was first performed at La Scala, Milan, 13 January 1867. 
Bazzini later taught composition to Giacomo Puccini and Pietro Mascagni at the Milan Conservatory.

Sabilla Novello
A free English translation from Schiller by Sabilla Novello was published in 1872.

Busoni Turandot Suite

After reading Gozzi's play, Ferruccio Busoni began sketching out some incidental music to accompany it (1904-1905). He swiftly expanded the sketches into the Turandot Suite, first performance 21 October 1905, published in 1906.  Busoni added a further movement to the Suite in 1911 for the play's first Berlin production (see below), and substituted another in 1917 after completing his opera on the same subject.

Karl Vollmoeller/Max Reinhardt production - Berlin

After completing his Turandot Suite Busoni approached Max Reinhardt in late 1906 about staging a production of Gozzi's play with Busoni's music. His idea eventually came to fruition four years later at the Deutsches Theater, Berlin in 1911, in a production by Reinhardt. Karl Vollmoeller provided a German translation of Gozzi's play, dedicated to Busoni; the sets were by Ernst Stern. The incidental music (probably the published Turandot Suite with the additional number) was played by a full symphony orchestra conducted by Oskar Fried.

Max Reinhardt production - London

Reinhardt's Berlin  production was brought to London in 1913 by the actor-manager and impresario Sir George Alexander. Vollmoeller's 1911 translation of Gozzi was re-translated into English by Jethro Bithell (1878-1962). A pupil of Busoni's, Johan Wijsman, made an unauthorised reduced orchestration of Busoni's score (and added music by other composers).

Cast of the play as produced at the St. James's Theatre, London, on 18 January 1913, under the management of Sir George Alexander.
Turandot:	Evelyn D'Alroy
Altoum:		J. H. Barnes
Adelma:		Hilda Moore
Zelima:		Maire O'Neill
Skirina:	Margaret Yarde
Barak:		Alfred Harris
Calaf:		Godfrey Tearle
Ishmael:	James Berry
Pantalone: 	Edward Sass
Tartaglia:	E. Vivian Reynolds
Brigella:	Fred Lewis
Truffaldino:	Norman Forbes
Prince of Samarkand:    	Austin Fehrman

Vollmoeller/J.C. Huffmann

Vollmoeller's play was produced in the USA by the Shuberts at the Hyperion Theatre, New Haven, Connecticut, on 31 December 1912. The producer was J. C. Huffmann, whose production designs were influenced by Reinhardt's.  The cast included Emily Stevens, Josephine Victor, Alice Martin, Margaret Greville, Frank Peters, Pedro de Cordova (José Luis Medrano), Edward Emery (see Florence Farr and John Emery), Lennox Pawle, Daniel Gilfeather, Anthony Andre and 20 others. Incidental music by Oscar Racin. According to a New York Times report, the Vollmoeller script arrived without scenes or acts being designated, and was tidied up by Huffmann; however, the play was not a success.

Percy MacKaye/J. C. Huffmann
In the wake of the failure of Vollmoeller's play at the Hyperion Theatre, Lee Shubert asked Percy MacKaye to revise Turandot for American audiences. In the end MacKaye wrote a new work, A Thousand Years Ago, which was presented a year later at the 
Shubert Theatre on 1 December 1913. The production re-used Huffmann's earlier set designs and incorporated the ideas of Reinhardt and Edward Gordon Craig. It transferred to the Lyric Theatre (New York) in January 1914.

Busoni Turandot opera

Busoni's opera Turandot was based on the music of his earlier orchestral Turandot Suite; he wrote his own libretto, also possibly using the translation which Karl Vollmoeller had made for the 1911 Reinhardt production. The opera was first performed in the Stadttheater, Zürich (now the Zürich Opera House) 11 May 1917.

Wilhelm Stenhammar
Wilhelm Stenhammar wrote his Musik till Carlo Gozzis skådepel "Turandot" (Music for Gozzi's spectacle "Turandot"), Op. 42 (1920) for flute, clarinet, bassoon and percussion (triangle, cymbals, bass drum and tamtam), as incidental music for a (Swedish?) production of the Gozzi play.  See also § External links below.

Yevgeny Vakhtangov - Moscow
Yevgeny Vakhtangov staged a highly acclaimed avant-garde performance of Gozzi's play in Moscow in 1921.

Provincetown Playhouse production 

Isaac Don Levine and Henry Alsberg translated and adapted Turandot to open the 1926 season at the Provincetown Playhouse in New York.

Puccini Turandot opera

Giacomo Puccini said in a letter that "...Turandot is the most normal and human play in all Gozzi." The libretto for his (unfinished) opera Turandot (1920-1924) is by Adami and Simoni. Apart from Gozzi's original they used Andrea Maffei's Italian translation of Schiller's German version. They also made reference to the libretto by Gazzoletti for Antonio Bazzini's Turanda. Although Puccini had heard reports about Busoni's opera, he didn't see it himself.

Princess Turandot (1934 film)
Prinzessin Turandot is a German black-and-white sound film made in 1934.  It was directed by Gerhard Lamprecht with a script by Thea von Harbou, and starred Käthe von Nagy as Turandot and Willy Fritsch as Kalaf, the Birdseller. The film includes the song Turandot, bezaubernde Turandot by Franz Doelle and Bruno Balz (recorded by Herbert Ernst Groh in 1935).

Havergal Brian
Havergal Brian based the libretto of his opera Turandot (1949-1951) on Schiller's play. Like Busoni, Brian also wrote an associated orchestral Turandot Suite. Brian composed his Turandot between his 8th and 9th Symphonies. In a letter, he wrote: "Turandot. I have not seen any music of the work by Busoni or Puccini.... My reason for tackling 'Turandot' was that I read a German translation and enjoyed it so much that I started work on it as an Opera."

Bertolt Brecht
Bertolt Brecht also made his own adaptation in of Gozzi's play, Turandot, or the Whitewashers' Congress (1953–1954).  Brecht's library contained a 1925 edition of Vollmoeller's translation. Brecht's epic comedy was first performed (posthumously) in Zurich (the same city as the premiere of Busoni's opera), in the Schauspielhaus on 5 February 1969.

Contemporary Chinese theatre 
Turandot has been recently rewritten and interpreted in different forms of Chinese xìqǔ (literally, 'theater of song'), often referred to as Chinese opera.

See also
Crystal Turandot Award, a Russian theatre award
 The Curse of Turandot, 2021 Chinese film, loosely based on Gozzi's play
Princess Turandot (disambiguation)

References
Notes

Citations

Sources

 
 
 
 
 
 
 
  
  Volume 1, Volume 2

External links
 The many faces of Turandot, by Peter Bassett. Retrieved 23 September 2015.
 Princess Turandot Fountain outside the Vakhtangov Theatre in Arbat Street, Moscow 
 
 Full score of Stenhammar's incidental music at IMSLP
 Complete film of Prinzessin Turandot on YouTube

1762 plays
Plays adapted into operas
Italian plays adapted into films
Plays by Carlo Gozzi